Matthew Segal (born October 18, 1985) is the co-founder of ATTN:, a Los Angeles-based media company that makes entertainment that informs, and an American social entrepreneur and media commentator. He previously co-founded Our Time, a nationwide non-profit network of young Americans promoting economic and voter empowerment.

Early life and education 
Segal was born in Chicago, Illinois, attended New Trier High School, and graduated magna cum laude from Kenyon College in 2008. He became an advocate for student voting rights in college after his campus polling place experienced the longest lines in the 2004 presidential election

Career 
After the reported 12 hour-long voting lines at Kenyon College in 2004, Segal provided testimony to the US House Judiciary Committee, which was investigating election irregularities, at the age of 19, noting that "It seems almost hypocritical that a society so focused on the importance of the vote did not concern itself more heavily with the actual process of voting."

When a junior in college, Segal founded Student Association for Voter Empowerment (SAVE) with the stated aim of "work[ing] to bring young Americans into the political process by breaking down barriers to electoral participation and encouraging youth-led policy solutions." He founded SAVE at age 21, which expanded to 40 college campuses in more than 15 states, and worked on election protection initiatives as well as expanding voter access through initiatives such as the Student VOTER Act.

After the 2008 presidential election, Segal co-founded the 80 Million Strong for Young American Jobs Coalition, the largest campaign of organizations in the United States that addressed youth unemployment and other economic challenges facing individuals under 30.  In this capacity, Segal spearheaded a national jobs summit in the U.S. Capitol with hundreds of young leaders, provided testimony to the House Education and Labor Committee, and was the only youth representative invited to attend President Barack Obama’s conference on jobs and economic growth.

Our Time 
In 2010, Segal combined SAVE with Declare Yourself, a voter registration non-profit founded by TV producer and director Norman Lear to form Our Time with the goal of bringing economic power to his generation, in the midst of the recession and beyond.

As an initiative of Our Time, Segal and his colleagues also launched Buy Young, an online marketplace of businesses founded and run by entrepreneurs under 30, encouraging Americans to purchase products from young companies and support youth job creation. Segal convened more than 125 young CEOs and executives in Washington, D.C. on July 13, 2011, at the White House, the Chamber of Commerce and Capitol Hill to launch the effort and push for greater job creation and economic opportunities for young Americans.

ATTN  
Segal and Our Time co-founder Jarrett Moreno launched ATTN: in 2014 to create "content that breaks down complex issues, making politics interesting for millennials, and analyzes the world from the perspective of the social media generation."

The company is based in Los Angeles and currently has about 130 employees. In 2019, ATTN: was named to Fast Company's list of Most Innovative Companies. The company produces original video content of all length, short form for social consumption, midform for Facebook Watch, IGTV and other platform, as well as long form for linear television and streaming services. Segal oversees the original content development department for company.

Media commentator 
Segal was a contributor to ABC News. He is frequently quoted in the press, and appears regularly on MSNBC and other TV networks as a correspondent to discuss the opinions and attitudes of Gen Z and Millennials as well as consumer behavior of young Americans. He has publicly called for expanded access to funding for entrepreneurs and increased public service opportunities for young Americans. Segal has been featured on C-SPAN, MSNBC, Fox, and CNN.

References

External links 
 ourtime.org

1985 births
Living people
American political activists
New Trier High School alumni
Kenyon College alumni